Antonella Confortola Wyatt (born 16 October 1975) is an Italian former cross-country skier and mountain runner.

Biography
Confortola was born in Cavalese. She is the granddaughter of Italian cross-country skier and Olympian Silvio Confortola.

Cross-country skiing
Confortola competed at the Olympics four times between 1998 and 2010. She earned a bronze medal in the 4 × 5 km relay at the 2006 Winter Olympics in Turin. Her best individual finish was 16th in the 15 km event at the 2002 Winter Olympics in Salt Lake City.

Confortola earned two medals in the 4 × 5 km relay at the FIS Nordic World Ski Championships (silver: 1999, bronze: 2005). Her best individual finish was a 15th in the 30 km in 2003. She won two individual races (5 km, 10 km) at the Continental Cup in 2004 in Italy.

Mountain running
Confortola has also competed in mountain running. She took fourth place at the 2010 European Mountain Running Championships in Bulgaria and the silver medal at the 2011 European Mountain Running Championships in Turkey.

Personal life
Confortola is married to New Zealand runner Jonathan Wyatt. They live in northern Italy with their daughter.

Cross-country skiing results
All results are sourced from the International Ski Federation (FIS).

Olympic Games
 1 medal – (1 bronze)

World Championships
 2 medals – (1 silver, 1 bronze)

World Cup

Team Podiums
 9 podiums – (9 )

Italian Championships
 1998: 2nd, Italian women's championships of cross-country skiing, 15 km
 1999:
 3rd, Italian women's championships of cross-country skiing, 15 km
 3rd, Italian women's championships of cross-country skiing, 10 km
 2002:
 3rd, Italian women's championships of cross-country skiing, 30 km
 3rd, Italian women's championships of cross-country skiing, 5 km pursuit
 2003:
 2nd, Italian women's championships of cross-country skiing, 30 km
 2nd, Italian women's championships of cross-country skiing, 10 km free & duathlon
 2nd, Italian women's championships of cross-country skiing, 5 km pursuit
 2004:
 3rd, Italian women's championships of cross-country skiing, 15 km
 3rd, Italian women's championships of cross-country skiing, 10 km
 2005: 3rd, Italian women's championships of cross-country skiing, 10 km
 2007: 2nd, Italian women's championships of cross-country skiing, 30 km
 2008:
 2nd, Italian women's championships of cross-country skiing, 2 x 7.5 km pursuit
 2nd, Italian women's championships of cross-country skiing, 10 km
 3rd, Italian women's championships of cross-country skiing, 30 km
 2009:
 2nd, Italian women's championships of cross-country skiing, 2 x 7.5 km pursuit
 2nd, Italian women's championships of cross-country skiing, 10 km
 2010: 2nd, Italian women's championships of cross-country skiing, 30 km

Mountain running

Team results
World Mountain Running Championships
 2002, 2004, 2010, 2011, 2013, 2014, 2016 (7)

National titles
Italian Mountain Running Championships
Mountain running: 2003, 2011, 2012 (3)
Italian Vertical Kilometer Championships
Vertical kilometer: 2014

Other results
Nuten Opp
 2008, 2009, 2010

See also
 List of multi-sport athletes - Skyrunning

References

External links
 
 
 
 

1975 births
Cross-country skiers at the 1998 Winter Olympics
Cross-country skiers at the 2002 Winter Olympics
Cross-country skiers at the 2006 Winter Olympics
Cross-country skiers at the 2010 Winter Olympics
Italian female cross-country skiers
Living people
Olympic cross-country skiers of Italy
Olympic bronze medalists for Italy
Olympic medalists in cross-country skiing
FIS Nordic World Ski Championships medalists in cross-country skiing
Medalists at the 2006 Winter Olympics
Universiade medalists in cross-country skiing
Italian female mountain runners
Italian sky runners
Universiade bronze medalists for Italy
Competitors at the 2001 Winter Universiade
World Long Distance Mountain Running Championships winners